Bharta Kalan is a village in Shaheed Bhagat Singh Nagar district of Punjab State, India. Kalan is Persian language word which means Big and Khurd is Persian word which means small when two villages have same name then it is distinguished as Kalan means Big and Khurd means Small with Village Name. The village is administrated by Sarpanch an elected representative of the village.

Demography 
As of 2011, Bharta Kalan has a total number of 355 houses and population of 1747 of which 882 include are males while 865 are females according to the report published by Census India in 2011. The literacy rate of Bharta Kalan is 78.68%, higher than the state average of 75.84%. The population of children under the age of 6 years is 171 which is 9.81% of total population of Bharta Kalan, and child sex ratio is approximately 988 as compared to Punjab state average of 846.

Most of the people are from Schedule Caste which constitutes 19.86% of total population in Bharta Kalan. The town does not have any Schedule Tribe population so far.

As per the report published by Census India in 2011, 547 people were engaged in work activities out of the total population of Bharta Kalan which includes 495 males and 52 females. According to census survey report 2011, 72.94% workers describe their work as main work and 27.06% workers are involved in Marginal activity providing livelihood for less than 6 months.

Education 
The village has a Punjabi medium, co-ed upper primary with secondary/higher secondary school founded in 1955. The schools provide mid-day meal as per Indian Midday Meal Scheme. The school provide free education to children between the ages of 6 and 14 as per Right of Children to Free and Compulsory Education Act. KC Engineering College and Doaba Khalsa Trust Group Of Institutions are the nearest colleges.

Landmarks and history 
Gurudwara Sheed Singh, Gurudwara Singh Sabha, Shiv Mandir and Roja Baba Peer Ji are religious sites. The village also has a community hall and a playground.

Transport 

See also 
List of villages in India

References

External links 
 Tourism of Punjab 
 Census of Punjab
 Locality Based PINCode

Villages in Shaheed Bhagat Singh Nagar district